BR549 (originally spelled BR5-49) was an American country rock band founded in 1993. It originally consisted of Gary Bennett (lead and background vocals, acoustic guitar), Don Herron (steel guitar, resonator guitar, fiddle, mandolin, acoustic guitar), "Smilin'" Jay McDowell (upright bass), Chuck Mead (lead and background vocals, acoustic guitar, electric guitar), and "Hawk" Shaw Wilson (drums, background vocals). Bennett and McDowell left the band in 2001, with Chris Scruggs and Geoff Firebaugh respectively replacing them. Both Firebaugh and Scruggs later left the band as well; Mark Miller has become the band's third bassist. The name of the band is taken from a mangled phone number from Hee Haw comedian Junior Samples' car salesman skit.

BR549 released six albums and two EPs, including three albums on Arista Nashville and two on Dualtone Records. The band's self-titled debut album produced three singles on the Billboard country charts in 1996. The band was nominated three times for the Grammy Award for Best Country Performance by a Duo or Group with Vocal, in 1996 ("Cherokee Boogie"), 1997 ("Wild One") and 1999 ("Honky Tonk Song").

History

Before moving to Nashville and forming BR5-49, Chuck Mead played in a band called Homestead Grays, a roots-rock outfit based in his hometown of Lawrence, Kansas. Gary Bennett, meanwhile fronted an informal band that played at Robert's Western Wear, a clothing store in Nashville, Tennessee, when he met Mead at a nearby bar. The two then decided to form a band officially, and completing the lineup were electric bassist Jim "Bones" Becker, then upright bassist "Smilin'" Jay McDowell (formerly of another band called Hellbilly), multi-instrumentalist Don Herron, and drummer "Hawk" Shaw Wilson. They assumed the name BR5-49 (from the telephone number of a used car dealer in a running Junior Samples comedy sketch on the television series Hee Haw), and began playing for tips at Robert's.

1995-2000: Arista Nashville
They were signed by Arista Nashville in September 1995. The band's first release for the label was an extended play entitled Live at Robert's, which comprised originals and cover songs. Following it in 1996 was their full-length debut album, also titled BR5-49. Despite minimal support from country radio, the album's lead-off single "Cherokee Boogie" (a cover of a Moon Mullican song) reached No. 44 on the Billboard country singles charts in the US, and No. 21 on the RPM country charts in Canada. Following this song were "Even If It's Wrong" and "Little Ramona (Gone Hillbilly Nuts)", which respectively reached No. 68 and No. 61 in the US. The album itself was a No. 33 on the Top Country Albums chart. The band also toured with The Mavericks, Junior Brown, and The Black Crowes and played on the PBS music program Austin City Limits in 1997.   According to the All Music Guide to Country, BR5-49's recording of "Honky Tonk Song" on the BR5-49 album should be considered an essential country song, although it does not consider either the album itself, or the group essential.

BR5-49's second album, Big Backyard Beat Show, was released in 1998. Despite not producing a chart single, this album reached No. 38 on the Top Country Albums chart. After touring with Brian Setzer, the band issued a live album, Coast to Coast, in 1999 on Arista as well. The band left Arista in 2000 after the label was merged with Sony BMG.

2001-present
After being dropped from Arista, they signed to Lucky Dog Records, a subsidiary of Epic Records. Their first release for the label, 2001's This Is BR549, also eliminated the hyphen from the band's name. Its only single, "Too Lazy to Work, Too Nervous to Steal", peaked at No. 11 on Country Singles Sales but did not enter the country singles charts proper. After this album, both Bennett and McDowell left the band, with Geoff Firebaugh succeeding McDowell as upright bassist, and Chris Scruggs taking over on guitar and vocals. The new lineup made its first appearance in 2003 on their self released album Temporarily Disconnected. In 2004, they signed with Dualtone Records and released Tangled in the Pines. Scruggs left the band to tour solo in 2005. Firebaugh also left to start his own band, Hillbilly Casino. Mark Miller replaced Firebaugh. A second album for Dualtone, Dog Days, was released in early 2006.

Since 2013 the band has been on hiatus, with Chuck Mead working solo with Mark Miller playing bass, and Don Herron touring with Bob Dylan.  On July 12, 2012, Jay McDowell announced on his personal Facebook page that the original line-up of BR5-49 would open for Old Crow Medicine Show at Woods Amphitheater in Nashville, TN on July 28. On July 27, 2012 the (reunited) original lineup recorded an original Gary Bennett song called "A Truck Stop Christmas" at the East Nashville Studio of Phil Harris, which was released on the 2012 Christmas compilation An East Nashville Christmas.  On May 9, 2013, it was announced that the original lineup would play together live once again, this time at the Havelock Country Jamboree in Canada on August 17, 2013.

Status of former members
Original co-frontman Gary Bennett released his solo debut, Human Condition, in February 2006. In October 2010 Raucous Records released Bennett's follow up album My Ol' Guitar co-produced by Kenny Vaughan and including several BR549 re-recordings.  

Smilin' Jay McDowell has gone on to work in post production in the music video world. He is now in charge of the video department for the Musicians Hall of Fame and Museum in Nashville. He directed a DVD project for Gary Bennett titled Inside and Out. 

Former bassist Geoff Firebaugh founded a rockabilly band named Hillbilly Casino that are a crowd favorite in downtown Nashville on lower Broadway. 

Chris Scruggs released a solo album titled Anthem in 2009. As of 2015, he is the bassist and multi-instrumentalist in Marty Stuart’s backing band, The Fabulous Superlatives.

Chuck Mead released Journeyman's Wager in 2009 and toured with his Grassy Knoll Boys in support of the release; this was followed by the classic-country covers album Back at the Quonset Hut in 2012 and Free State Serenade in 2014.  In 2006 Chuck began his association with the hit Broadway Musical Million Dollar Quartet beginning in Florida as the Musical Arranger and Musical Director; he has also worked with the cast at The Village Theatre near Seattle, Washington, The Goodman Theatre in Chicago and The Nederlander Theatre on Broadway in New York City.  He is currently working with the new cast in England as they prepare to open at The Noël Coward Theatre in  City of Westminster.

Mark Miller was a founding member of The Ex-Husbands, formed in New York City in 1993 with lead singer Anders Thomsen and drummer Michael Smith. The band released two critically acclaimed albums on Tar Hut Records – a self-titled debut and the follow-up, All Gussied Up.  Both made the Gavin Americana top 20 and the latter reached that chart's top 10. Miller released the solo record Dodsen Chapel in 2005.

Original bass picker Jim "Bones" Becker is now retired and says, "I'm not doing anything now, and I'm getting damn good at it!"

Musical style and influences

According to Trouser Press, while alternative country bands typically try to emulate the sound of pre-rock and roll era country music, BR549's sound draws from post-rock and roll styles, "when honky tonk, rockabilly, Western swing, bittersweet storyteller swill and Sheb Wooley all commingled in search of proper homes in the evolving country landscape." BR549's sound  encompasses alternative country, Western swing, Bakersfield sound, rockabilly and country rock. According to Trouser Press, the band "poised themselves as authentic defenders of the faith, but a name taken from a recurring Hee Haw skit and a predilection for campy vintage clothing threatened to make them alt-country’s answer to Sha Na Na." Steve Huey of AllMusic described their sound and appearance as "unabashedly retro", as the band's members dressed in "old, budget-friendly clothes".

Members
 Chuck Mead – guitar, vocals
 Gary Bennett – guitar, vocals
 Shaw Wilson – drums, backing vocals
 Don Herron – fiddle, steel guitar, mandolin, Dobro, banjo
 Smilin' Jay McDowell – upright bass

Former members
 "Bones" Jim Becker – electric bass
 "Buggs" Tex Austin (Mark Ude) – saxophone
 Chris Scruggs – guitar, vocals
 Geoff Firebaugh – upright bass
 Mark Miller – upright bass, vocals

Discography

Albums

Extended plays

Singles

Music videos

References

External links
Chuck Mead's official solo site
Gary Bennett's official solo site
Jim "Bones" Becker official "solo" site
Jay McDowell Interview NAMM Oral History Library (2021)

American alternative country groups
American country rock groups
Arista Nashville artists
Arista Records artists
Country music groups from Tennessee
Dualtone Records artists
Musical groups from Nashville, Tennessee
Rockabilly music groups